This list is of fictional characters in the ABC Family television series The Fosters. This article features the main, recurring and minor characters who have all appeared in more than one episode.

Cast

Cast table

  In season 5, Danny Nucci is only credited on the episodes in which Mike appears but still in the opening titles.

Main characters

Stef Adams Foster
Portrayed by Teri Polo
Stefanie "Stef" Marie Adams Foster (season 1–present) is a police officer. She and Mike Foster, her partner at work, are Brandon's biological parents. They divorced shortly after Stef met Lena and realized she's a lesbian and wanted to be with her. In a flashback in episode 9, when she first met the twins, it is shown that she has a very caring nature despite her tough appearance. At the end of episode 1x10, Stef and Lena are officially married, legally cementing their long-term union of ten years. Stef is very strong and tough, but is also very funny and loving. Callie initially doesn't feel comfortable around her due to her position as a cop, but gradually forms a close bond with her. While Stef likes to act tough around everyone, especially Lena, it is shown that she cares a great deal about her wife and family, although she won't hesitate to discipline her kids if need be.

Lena Adams Foster
Portrayed by Sherri Saum
Lena Elizabeth Adams Foster (season 1–present) is Stef's wife, Brandon's stepmother, and the other children's adoptive/foster mother. While neither she or Stef are really the dominant one in their relationship, Lena has a more motherly nature. She is good with kids and tries often to reason with her kids more so than punish them, despite Stef's usually "quick to act" nature. She is the biracial vice principal of the charter school the kids attend. In episode 8, she and Stef get into a fight about Lena wanting to be married and never discussing it, showing that while she is more a lover than a fighter she will defend herself, but more so around Stef than anyone else. It was Lena who decided to take Callie in after she was released from the juvenile detention center. Lena is very aware of the people around her and takes on the role of caring mother to all of the kids. She is artificially inseminated with co-worker Timothy's sperm, desiring to have a biological child of her own, and finds out she is pregnant shortly afterwards in the season 1 finale. However, in season 2, she is diagnosed with life-threatening pre-eclampsia and, consequently, loses the baby.

Jesus Adams Foster
Jesus Adams Foster (born Jesus Gutierrez) is the biological son of Ana Gutierrez and Gabriel Duncroft, as well as, the adoptive son of Stef and Lena Adams Foster. He is the fraternal twin brother of Mariana and the adoptive brother of Brandon, Callie, and Jude. Jesus has ADHD and was fiercely protective of his twin.

Mariana Adams Foster
Portrayed by Cierra Ramirez
Mariana Adams Foster (season 1–present) was one of the twins that Lena and Stef fostered as children and eventually adopted. She was fostered as a young child, and eventually adopted, by Lena and Stef. She is very smart and girly, and cares about her appearance very much. She is popular and social, likes to gossip, and speaks Spanish fluently. She is naive when it comes to certain topics - especially her birth mother, but she smartens up about her when finally realizing she was using her for money. She changes herself for guys and friends like in "The Morning After" when she sees that an old friend, Garrett is cute now and writes poetry, she goes to a Poetry Slam with him, and pierces her nose herself for him since he was hanging out with a girl who was dressed much edgier than Mariana. Also, in season 2, she dyes her hair blonde to fit in when making it on a dance team only to overhear the other girls say she only did because she is Latina. However, she eventually gains the confidence in herself to not give in to what other people say and make her feel. Mariana has a thing for the bad boys later on in the seasons and she gets caught up into some trouble. Her ex-boyfriend Nick gets put into a mental hospital because he was hearing voices.

Jude Adams Foster
Portrayed by Hayden Byerly
Jude Adams Foster (season 1–present) is Callie's 13-year-old half brother, who Callie and Brandon rescue from an abusive foster home. He is a quiet child with somewhat more optimistic views on foster homes than Callie, though he has been moved from foster home to foster home along with his sister and been abused as well. Once he is moved into the Fosters' home, he quickly begins to adjust to the new lifestyle and becomes more talkative and energetic. At school, he develops a close friendship with a handsome and kind-hearted boy named Connor, a growing relationship which prompts Jude to begin questioning his sexuality. As the series progresses, Jude turns 13 and is subsequently adopted by Lena and Stef, although a technicality regarding Callie's birth certificate prevents her from being adopted along with him. He deals with the emotional impact of Callie becoming close to her biological family, but realizes that she will always be with him no matter what. He later develops a romance with his best friend, Connor, and the two begin dating in the season 2 finale. In the mid-season 3 finale the two admit they love each other for the first time after Connor considers moving to Los Angeles to live with his more accepting mother.

Brandon Foster
Portrayed by David Lambert
Brandon Foster (season 1–present) is the 16-year-old son of Stef and her ex-husband, Mike. He is one of Callie's love interests. He is very talented musically, specifically with the piano, and writes piano pieces which he presents for chances at scholarships. He has been shown to have an unsteady relationship with his father, Mike, due to the fact that Mike is a struggling alcoholic and has disappointed him many times through his childhood and teen years. At the start of Season 1, Brandon has a girlfriend named Talya, but breaks up with her because of his growing feelings for Callie and his annoyance and anger at her harassment and jealousy directed at Callie. For most of the first season, Brandon continues to pursue Callie romantically, even though she warned him that she could be kicked out of the house if they got involved. Brandon continues to make reckless decisions, included violating a restraining order, in order to be with Callie. Ultimately, he accepts that Callie needs a family more than a relationship, and eventually agrees to a mutual break up. He eventually joins a band and begins a relationship with bandmate Lou.

Callie Adams Foster
Portrayed by Maia Mitchell
Callie Adams Foster (season 1–present), 17, is one of the Foster family's new foster children. Callie is headstrong and tough as a result of being in the foster system since she was a child, but holds a soft spot for her younger brother Jude. She was sent to Juvie for destroying a car in order to protect him from their foster father's abuse. After she is released from Juvie and placed with the Fosters, Callie and Brandon rescue Jude, who is subsequently fostered by the Foster family as well. Callie has had a hard life— her mother is dead and her father is in jail and she has been abused in many ways in the foster care system. She initially has trouble opening herself up to her new family, but she slowly comes to love and accept them as her "forever" family. Initially, Callie opens up mainly to Brandon, and the two develop a romantic relationship, although it is forbidden by the rules of the foster system, which soon meets a heartbreaking end. Callie also holds an on-again, off-again relationship with a classmate named Wyatt. Unfortunately, after the Fosters decide to adopt Callie and Jude, Callie learns that the man she thought was her father (Donald Jacob) is not. She then pursues to meet her biological father, as well as her half-sister who looks as if she could be her identical twin. In the episode "Lucky" from season 3, she is officially adopted and an "Adams Foster."

she is also the step-daughter of Donald Jacob and the adoptive daughter of Stef and Lena Adams Foster. She is the maternal half-sister of Jude, the paternal half-sister of Sophia, and the adoptive sister of Mariana, Jesus, and Brandon.

Mike Foster
Portrayed by Danny Nucci
Michael "Mike" Foster (season 1–present) is a San Diego police sergeant, Brandon's father, and Stef's ex-husband and ex-police patrol partner. As the series progresses, it is revealed that Mike has a drinking problem, but joins AA to cope with it. A frequent visitor to the Foster household, Mike is familiar with his son's family. Toward the end of the first season, he started dating Dani, who helped him to keep his sobriety. However, he soon discovers that Dani had sex with a drunken Brandon one night and arrests her for statutory rape. Since then, Mike helps Ana come to terms with her addiction and live a clean life.

Recurring and minor characters

Cast

Characters
 Annika Marks as Monte Porter (season 2-present), the principal at Anchor Beach Community Charter School. An attractive, personable professional woman, Monte wants to focus on administration, budget and finance, giving Lena control over student curriculum.
 Bianca A. Santos as Lexi Rivera (season 1, season 3): Mariana's best friend and Jesus' ex-girlfriend who moves to Honduras in "Honeymoon". She is also an undocumented immigrant.
 Jordan Rodrigues as Mat (season 2-present): A guitarist in Lou's band. Mariana has a small crush on him and they soon begin a relationship together.
 Alex Saxon as Wyatt (season 1-present): Callie's friend and on-again, off-again boyfriend. In "I Do" Wyatt reveals that his mother is moving him to Indiana to live with his grandmother. He returns in "Metropolis" and resumes his relationship with Callie.
 Madisen Beaty as Talya Banks (season 1, season 3): Brandon's girlfriend in the beginning of the series before the two broke up. Brandon broke up with her due to her intense jealousy over Callie. After this, she remains Callie's enemy.
 Alexandra Barreto as Ana Gutierrez (season 1-present): Mariana and Jesus' biological mother. She is a drug addict, and repeatedly tries to manipulate Mariana into giving her money to support her addiction. She even suggests that Mariana steal something from her parents in order to obtain more money for herself. Mike helps her to finally become sober and it is later revealed that she is pregnant and hopes to be a better mother than she was to Mariana and Jesus.
 April Parker Jones as Captain Roberts (season 1, season 4): Stef and Mike's boss.
 Anne Winters as Kelsey (season 1): A girl who is sent to a rehab after having problems with drugs. She is a friend of Mariana's, and after coming back from rehab, becomes her enemy because they both liked the same guy.
 Brandon W. Jones as Liam Olmstead (season 1-present): A boy from one of Callie's previous foster homes. Liam raped Callie while she was living with his family as a foster child and lied that she came onto him, resulting in her and Jude being forced out of the home.
 Justina Machado as Sofía "Sophia" Rivera (season 1): Lexi's protective and religious mother. Despite being religious, she and her husband support the LGBT community.
 Carlos Sanz as Ernesto Rivera (season 1): Sofia's husband and Lexi's father.
 Gavin MacIntosh as Connor Stevens (season 1-season 3): Jude's classmate, best friend and, later, love interest, who accepts Jude as he is and encourages him to express his true personality. In season two, he informs Jude that his dad thinks Jude is gay and doesn't want him to spend time with Jude anymore because of it. Despite pressure from his dad, the two were able to maintain a friendship together. Later, it's revealed that the two boys kissed while on a school camping trip in their shared tent together, a moment they have ignored ever since. As their friendship continues to evolve, their relationship becomes complicated. In the episode "Now Hear This", they kiss on-screen for the first time and at the end of the next episode, Connor is shot in the foot and, in the next episode, officially comes out to his father and Jude. After finally being able to see Jude, they begin to officially date. In the mid-season 3 finale, Connor decides to move to Los Angeles to live with his mother due to his father's continuing homophobia and inability to accept him. Though both are heartbroken, Connor and Jude agree to maintain a long-distance relationship and profess their love for each other for the first time.
 Amanda Leighton as Emma (season 1-present): A girl on Jesus' wrestling team who is known to be independent, semi-bossy and tom-boyish. She is a love interest for Jesus and the two began dating, but broke up due to her bossiness in their relationship.
 Julian De La Celle as Zac Rogers (season 1): A boy who worked on the school play with Mariana and was her first boyfriend. They dated until he had to move away to live with his dad when his mother was diagnosed with early-onset Alzheimer's.
 Garrett Clayton as Chase (season 1, season 3): Mariana's former love interest and star of the high school play.
 Jay Ali as Timothy (season 1-present): Callie's and Talya's literature teacher. They call him by his first name. He was Stef and Lena's new baby's biological father before the baby died due to pregnancy complications.
 Mary Mouser as Sarah (season 1-2): A foster child in Callie's foster child support group who was staying with Liam and his family. Callie became worried for her safety upon learning Liam was with her. She was then taken out of Liam's home after Callie confessed to Lena and Stef about Liam assaulting her.
 Sam McMurray as Frank Cooper (season 1, season 5): Stef's late father, who struggled to accept Stef's relationship with Lena. He dies in "Family Day", deeply affecting Stef who regretted never making amends with him. A vision of Frank appears to Stef in season 5.
 Annie Potts as Sharon Elkin (season 1-present): Stef's supportive mother and ex-wife of Frank.
 Lorraine Toussaint as Dana Adams (season 1-present): Lena's mother who is oblivious to Lena's biracial struggles. The two have something of a rocky relationship, due to Dana not seeing Lena as a "real" African American woman, but Dana is there for Lena when she needs it.
 Stephen Collins/Bruce Davison as Reverend Stuart Adams (season 1-present): Lena's father.
 Daffany Clark as Daphne (season 1-present): A girl in Callie's group home who becomes one of her best friends. She has a young daughter who she intends to get back one day.
 Rosie O'Donnell as Rita Hendricks (season 1-present): A leader of a group home who befriends Callie.
 Tom Phelan as Cole (season 1-present): A transgender boy in Callie's group home.
 Cherinda Kincherlow as Kiara (season 1-present): Callie's roommate as well as house sponsor while Callie is at Girls United. She offers Callie advice on how to survive at Girls United.
 Marla Sokoloff as Dani (season 1-2): Mike's girlfriend and recovering alcoholic. She wants to help Brandon out in his daily struggles, even supporting his relationship with Callie until she breaks up with him. After she and Mike break up, she ends up having sex with a drunken Brandon. After this, she later gets back together with Mike. Despite trying to convince him to keep their one night stand a secret, Brandon confesses about having sex with her, therefore getting Dani arrested for statutory rape.
 Romy Rosemont as Amanda Rogers (season 1): Zac's mother who suffers from Early-onset Alzheimer's disease.
 Reiley McClendon as Vico (season 1-2): A boy on the wrestling team that brings Brandon in on the fake IDs. After Brandon scares away all of his customers, he seeks revenge by jumping Brandon at night and breaking his hand. He is now attending military school and is on probation.
 Caitlin Carver as Hayley Heinz (season 2-present): A dancer with Mariana on the dance team who has a secret relationship with Jesus before being dumped by him.
 Kerr Smith as Robert Quinn (season 2-present): Callie's biological father. He grows attached to Callie after getting to know her and, despite promising to hand her over to the Fosters, finds himself unable to give her up. He soon refuses to sign his abandonment papers, devastating Callie.
 Bailee Madison as Sophia Quinn (season 2-present): Robert Quinn's other daughter and Callie's biological paternal half-sister, who wants to meet her. They develop a close relationship. In the summer finale, she reveals that when Robert tried to send the adoption papers, she ripped them up and threw them out so Callie couldn't get adopted. After an upset Callie yells at Sophia, calling her a "spoiled little brat", Sophia locks herself in the bathroom in tears.
 Ashley Argota as Lou (season 2-present): An attractive singer in whom Brandon takes an interest.

References

Characters
Fosters